Superman and Lois Lane are a fictional couple and the first superhero comic book romance. Created by writer Jerry Siegel and artist Joe Shuster, both characters including Superman's alter ego, Clark Kent, first appeared in DC Comics' Action Comics #1 (June 1938). They have remained in a complicated relationship ever since. A supercouple, they are among the best known fictional couples and have appeared in multiple media adaptations.

The characters' relationship was based for a long time in a love triangle in which Clark was interested in Lois who was smitten with the superhero Superman. Clark, unable to reveal to Lois that his mild-mannered demeanor was a ruse, was unable to compete for Lois' affection. The irony being he was his own rival in that Clark and Superman are, in fact, the same person. This love triangle and the dual identity were originally conceived in 1934. Following John Byrne's 1986 reboot, The Man of Steel, Clark's character became not only the more dominant personality of the Clark Kent/Superman character and more outgoing, aggressive, and assertive. This allowed a more natural romance to develop between Lois and Clark.

In the 1990s, Clark proposed marriage to Lois and revealed his identity as Superman to her. They began a long engagement, which was complicated by the death of Superman, a breakup, and several other problems. The couple married in Superman: The Wedding Album (December 1996). Clark and Lois' biological child in DC Comics canon was born in Convergence: Superman #2 (July 2015), a son named Jon Kent, who becomes Superboy.

Lois is the character most prominently featured with Superman, she appears in virtually every Superman comics and media adaptations and continues to be an essential part of the Superman mythos. Across decades of comics and other media adaptations, in some stories, Lois knows or suspects that Clark is Superman, sometimes this is explored for humour or plot development.

Creation
The characters, Superman/Clark Kent and Lois Lane, were created by Jerry Siegel and Joe Shuster. Superman was conceived as being like the ideal Hollywood romantic hero of the time, portrayed in films by actors such as Douglas Fairbanks, Clark Gable, and Rudolph Valentino. Siegel and Shuster were both fans of silent film actor Douglas Fairbanks, his films The Mark of Zorro (1920), Robin Hood (1922), and The Black Pirate (1926) became a huge influence on their writing and art on the Superman character. The idea of making Superman a visitor from another planet was inspired by Edgar Rice Burroughs' John Carter of Mars stories. Clark Kent's character grew out of Siegel and Shuster's own personal lives. His name is the combined names of actors Clark Gable and Kent Taylor. Clark Kent's demeanor was based on Harold Lloyd. Lois Lane was inspired by actress Glenda Farrell's portrayal of the fictional reporter Torchy Blane in a series of films. Siegel took her name from actress Lola Lane. Shuster based Lois Lane's physical appearance on a model name Joanne Carter. Carter later married co-creator Jerry Siegel in 1948.

On the conception of Superman's dual identity, Jerry Siegel said in the 1983 Nemo magazine interview: "That occurred to me in late 1934, when I decided that I'd like to do Superman as a newspaper strip. I approached Joe about it, and he was enthusiastic about the possibility. I was up late one night, and more and more ideas kept coming to me, and I kept writing out several weeks of syndicate scripts for the proposed newspaper strip. When morning came, I had written several weeks of material, and I dashed over to Joe's place and showed it to him. [This was the story that appeared in Action Comics #1, June, 1938, the first published appearance of Superman.] You see, Clark Kent grew not only out of my private life but also out of Joe's. As a high school student, I thought that some day I might become a reporter, and I had crushes on several attractive girls who either didn't know I existed or didn't care I existed. As a matter of fact, some of them looked like they hoped I didn't exist. It occurred to me: What if I was real terrific? What if I had something special going for me, like jumping over buildings or throwing cars around or something like that? Then maybe they would notice me. That night when all the thoughts were coming to me, the concept came to me that Superman could have a dual identity and that in one of his identities he could be meek and mild, as I was, and wear glasses, the way I do. The heroine, who I figured would be a girl reporter, would think he was some sort of a worm, yet she would be crazy about this Superman character who could do all sorts of fabulous things. In fact, she was real wild about him, and a big inside joke was that the fellow she was crazy about was also the fellow whom she loathed. By coincidence, Joe was a carbon copy [of me]."

Jerry Siegel objected to any proposal that Lois discovers Clark Kent is Superman because he felt that, as implausible as Clark's disguise is, the love triangle was too important to the stories appeal. Siegel stated: "If Lois should ACTUALLY learn Clark's secret, the strip would lose about 75% of its appeal—the human interest angle. I know that a formula can possibly prove monotonous through repetition but I fear that if this element is removed from the story formula that makes up SUPERMAN, that this strip will lose a great part of its effectiveness."

Comics

1938–1986

Superman/Clark Kent and Lois Lane first appeared in Action Comics #1 (June 1938), other than the fact that Superman had been rocketed to Earth as an infant, his complex backstory had yet to develop. The first story includes a sequence in which Clark behaved in a cowardly fashion, leaving Lois to defend herself against an aggressive man, from whom Superman later saves her. From then on, Clark was established as a shy man attracted to Lois, while she was interested in his heroic alter ego, Superman. This remained the status quo in the comics for decades, though Lois did warm up to Clark for the most part; yet their relationship could not really advance with Lois left out of Clark's secret and the Clark Kent persona is a disguise.

As early as the 1940s, Lois began to suspect that Clark Kent was Superman, the first such story appears in Superman #17 (July–August 1942) in a story titled "Man or Superman" by Jerry Siegel and Joe Shuster. Across decades of comics, Lois would suspect Clark is Superman and tries to prove it, but Superman always thwarts her. This theme became particularly pronounced in the 1950s and 1960s comics. In the Bronze Age of Comic Books, Lois became more of a heroic figure, more independent of Superman and was less interested in his secret identity.

The first DC Comics story where Superman marries Lois Lane (not dreams, hoaxes or imaginary tales, but in DC canon) was in Action Comics #484 (June 1978). In this 40th anniversary of Superman issue, a wizard wanted to rid the world of Superman but had no idea that Superman had a secret identity. Clark, with no memory of being Superman and therefore no need to pretend to be a coward. The new take charge Clark Kent, who was fearless and bold, became very attractive to Lois Lane—proving that it was more about attitude and personality than superpowers that attracted her to Superman. Lois and the new Clark began dating, fell in love and eventually, he proposed the couple got married. On their honeymoon, when Lois saw Clark caught in a crossfire that should have killed him, but left no mark on him, she began to suspect he was really Superman. Lois tried to cut a lock of his hair, the scissors broke. As much as she loved Clark with no memory of being Superman, Lois knew that the world needed Superman and found the wizard who had cast the spell and had him reverse it. Clark remembered he was Superman but also his marriage to Lois. He took Lois to the Fortress of Solitude and married her again in a Kryptonian ceremony as Superman. From that point on, Lois and Clark/Superman of the alternate universe known as Earth-Two remained married in DC Comics. This version of the character stars in The Superman Family comic book in the series Mr. and Mrs. Superman, which feature the adventures of the Earth-Two Superman and his wife, Lois Lane Kent. The couple later appeared in the 2005 Infinite Crisis limited series.

In the main DC universe, things stay the same, Lois was still not allowed to discover Superman's dual identity. She loved Superman, but he said he belonged to the world and could not commit to anyone. In 1985, the DC universe went through a revamp with the Crisis on Infinite Earths limited series. The purpose of the year-long event was to get rid of some character histories, conflicting continuity, and overlapping worlds.

In the 1986 two-part story Whatever Happened to the Man of Tomorrow? by Alan Moore and Curt Swan, that told the final tale of Superman (which was being rebooted following the events of Crisis on Infinite Earths, before his modern introduction in the John Byrne series). The story is a frame story set ten years after Superman was last seen, where Lois Lane recounts the end of Superman's career to a reporter. The story includes numerous attacks against Superman by his enemies, the public revelation of his secret identity as Clark Kent, and a number of deaths of his friends. At the end of the story, it is revealed that Lois' husband, the car mechanic Jordan Elliot is Superman. He is without powers and living as an ordinary man with Lois and their son Jonathan. The final image is of Jordan delivering a classic Superman wink to the reader, as he and Lois continue to "live happily ever after". The story was designed to honor the long history of the Superman character and serves as a complete conclusion to his mythology.

1986–2011

Following Crisis on Infinite Earths, DC Comics released six-issue limited series The Man of Steel by John Byrne. The series told the story of Superman's modern origin. Superman was now never Superboy in his youth, and Clark Kent became the real person and Superman the disguise. There was finally a setting in which Lois could logically fall in love with Clark Kent because he was the real person this time; although it would take years for Lois to have romantic feeling for Clark after he scooped her on the exclusive Superman story.

In Superman #44 (June 1990), the couple made peace and begin dating and fall in love. In Superman #50 (December 1990), Clark proposes to Lois, she accepts. Clark did not tell Lois his secret as the superhero Superman until weeks later in Action Comics #662 (February 1991). After contemplating the revelation and its implications, Lois decides it all comes down to love. She loves Clark and wants to spend the rest of her life with him.

Due to the upcoming television series Lois & Clark: The New Adventures of Superman, a chain of events were put into motion to prevent Clark and Lois in the comics from getting married until the TV couple was ready to get married. Superman was killed off by Doomsday in Superman #75 (January 1993). After a year of mourning, searching and resurrecting in The Death and Return of Superman storyline, Superman returned to the land of the living and the arms of Lois Lane. When Clark and Lois on the television series married in October 1996, so did their comic book counterpart in the special Superman: The Wedding Album (December 1996).

In 2006, the couple adopts a boy, the biological son of Kryptonian villains General Zod and Ursa and named him Chris Kent in the story arc Last Son. Although Clark is quick to embrace parenthood, Lois is more reluctant, until she sees how vulnerable and sweet Chris is, and the three of them become a happy family. When Zod invades Earth, during the battle, Chris along with his birth parents are sucked into the Phantom Zone, leaving Clark and Lois without their son and heartbroken. Chris later returned as a teenager under the guise of Nightwing.

In the 2009 Superman: Secret Origin, a six-part miniseries by Geoff Johns and Gary Frank that detailed Superman's new origin story (replacing Mark Waid's 2003 limited series Superman: Birthright) in the post-Infinite Crisis DC Universe. In the series, Lois becomes Clark's mentor when he begins his employment at the Daily Planet. The paper has been in financial trouble since Lex Luthor controls nearly every media outlet in Metropolis and the Daily Planet is the only major newspaper that directly attacks him. In Superman's first public appearance, he saves Lois when she falls off the LexCorp building. Understanding the flying hero's benevolence, Lois writes a positive article on him, which boosts the Daily Planets sales 700%. Eventually, Luthor becomes involved with General Sam Lane, Lois' father, so that they can defeat Superman, believing him to be an alien threat. Superman defeats Metallo, a U.S. soldier converted into a cyborg, and public opinion turns in Superman's favor. In the aftermath, Clark and Lois become friendly rivals, while Superman and Lois begin to develop mutual romantic feelings.

2011–present

In 2011, DC Comics rebooted its continuity with the New 52 relaunch. In the relaunch, Lois views Clark as a friend and respects him as a journalist, but regards him as a loner who has difficulty letting people get close to him and displays no existing knowledge of his dual identity. Superman Unchained, a nine-issue series by Scott Snyder and Jim Lee explores Clark's connection with Lois in the New 52.

Released in April 2015, the miniseries Convergence features a post-Crisis version of a married Superman and Lois Lane. The couple is expecting the impending birth of their child, and Superman has to protect the city after it was taken out of time by a powerful alternate version of Brainiac. Convergence shows the birth of their son, Jon Kent, Clark and Lois' biological child in DC Comics canon.

Following Convergence, DC announced a spin-off comic book series Superman: Lois and Clark. The eight-issue series debuting in October 2015 by Dan Jurgens and Lee Weeks is set several years after the Convergence event. The series focuses on Clark and Lois' relationship and their son Jon, living in the New 52 universe. Clark and Lois operating undercover- Superman discreetly helping out in a black variant of his suit and Lois writing exposes under the name 'Author X'.

In June 2016, DC relaunched its entire line of comic book titles with DC Rebirth. DC re-established Lois and Clark's relationship and marriage in DC continuity, along with their son Jonathan, who eventually becomes the newest Superboy in DC Comics.

The story arc Superman Reborn smooths over the discrepancies between the two versions of Superman and Lois Lane. According to Mr. Mxyzptlk, the creation of the New 52 caused Superman and Lois to be separated into two people: the New 52 characters that served as the protagonists of the Superman books in 2011-2015 and the post-Crisis characters that took part in the Convergence event and sired Jon. Mxyzptlk provides a meta-reference to their relationship and says he could not keep Superman and Lois apart when DC Comics could not; referencing the negative reactions from fans when DC dissolved their relationship at the beginning of the New 52. Thanks to Jon, the New 52 and post-Crisis counterparts of Superman and Lois merge into complete versions of themselves, rearranging their shared histories and accommodating them into the restored DC Universe.

The story of the Kents continues as Jor-El, Superman's biological father, re-surfaces on Earth and offers to bring Jonathan into space so he can teach the boy how to be a proper Kryptonian. Despite Clark's protests, Jon accepts his grandfather's proposal and Lois decides to stay at Jon's side, leaving Clark alone on Earth. Weeks later, Lois and Jon return to Earth, both initially remaining distant from Superman for different reasons: Lois is writing a book about her marriage with Superman and Jon has become a teenager over the course of his journey with Jor-El.

Radio
Aired from 1940 to 1951, the long-running radio serial The Adventures of Superman starring the DC Comics character Superman; for the bulk of the series run, Bud Collyer voiced Superman/Clark Kent, and Joan Alexander voiced Lois Lane.

Films

1940s and 1950s Superman films
The first live-action appearance of Superman on film is the 1948 Columbia Pictures film serial Superman. The fifteen part black-and-white film stars Kirk Alyn as Superman/Clark Kent and Noel Neill as Lois Lane. Both actors returned in Columbia's second live-action Superman film, Atom Man vs. Superman (1950). In the 1951 independent film, Superman and the Mole Men, Superman/Clark Kent was played by George Reeves and Phyllis Coates as Lois Lane.

Christopher Reeve Superman films

The film Superman was released by Warner Bros. in 1978, based on the DC Comics character. Christopher Reeve portrayed Superman/Clark Kent and Margot Kidder as Lois Lane. Directed by Richard Donner with music by John Williams, the film led to three theatrical sequels, Superman II (1980), Superman III (1983) and Superman IV: The Quest For Peace (1987). In 2006, Superman II: The Richard Donner Cut was released on DVD, featuring director Richard Donner's original vision for Superman II.

One of the most important aspects in the first and second films was the romantic relationship between the two main characters; Clark was hopelessly in love with Lois and even gave up his powers to be with her.

The relationship between Superman/Clark Kent and Lois Lane develops and grows over the first two films. In Superman, Lois meets Clark when he begins working at the Daily Planet newspaper. She is introduced to his Superman persona when he rescues her from a helicopter accident. Lois quickly becomes enamoured with Superman and accepts his offer to be interviewed for the newspaper. During the interview, she learns about Superman's homeworld, his abilities, and takes a fly in the sky over Metropolis. Lois later dies in an earthquake caused by Lex Luthor in the climax of the first film. Superman is so distraught by her death that he flies around the globe at supernatural speed, travelling backward in time and preventing the earthquake from occurring, saving Lois' life.

In Superman II, Lois becomes suspicious of Clark and eventually discovers he is Superman. Clark tells Lois more about himself, flying her to the Fortress of Solitude and revealing that he loves her. Wanting to spend his life with Lois, Clark uses a Kryptonian device to alter his DNA, making him human. Soon after, Clark and Lois learn that three Kryptonian have arrived on Earth and is threatening humanity. Clark decides to restore his powers and defeats the Kryptonians. Later, Clark finds Lois upset about knowing his secret and not being able to be open about her true feelings. Clark kisses Lois, using his abilities to wipe her mind of her knowledge of the past few days.

A different love interest for Superman played by Annette O'Toole was introduced in the third film. With Kidder returning as the female lead and Superman's love in Superman IV.

Superman Returns

The 2006 film Superman Returns serves as a homage sequel to the motion pictures Superman (1978) and Superman II (1980). Brandon Routh played the role of Superman/Clark Kent and Kate Bosworth as Lois Lane.

In the film, Superman has disappeared for many years. On his return to Earth, he finds the world he left behind has changed in ways he did not expect. Lois is a mother and is engaged to Richard White (Perry White's nephew). Lois and Richard's son, Jason White, is later revealed to be Superman's son after the child begins to show superpowers.

DC Extended Universe

Man of Steel

In 2013 Warner Bros. released Man of Steel, directed by Zack Snyder and produced by Christopher Nolan, and the first film in the DC Extended Universe. Henry Cavill stars in the title role as Superman/Clark Kent and Amy Adams as Lois Lane.

In Man of Steel, unlike in previous adaptations, Lois was made aware of Clark's identity as Superman very early on in the film. The traditional love triangle between Clark Kent, Lois Lane, and Superman was removed. This was part of an effort to reinvent Superman in the modern world. Warner Bros. initially questioned the decision, but screenwriter David S. Goyer insisted that Lois should know Clark's secret as Superman; because they are trying to depict Superman in a more realistic, more relatable way. Goyer said sidestepping the alter ego problem is not an issue with Lois. Moving forward, Lois will be Clark's secret keeper, and they will be in a real relationship.

Director Zack Snyder said Lois needed to be a match for Superman, a girl who intrigues him. Snyder describes Superman is "falling in love" with the reporter and affirm the bond between Clark and Lois is a vital part of the film. Producer Deborah Snyder said while Lois and Superman immediately click, their upbringings are on opposite ends of a cultural gulf that make their romance like the pairing of a country mouse with a city mouse. "The fact that he picks Lois makes him better. Because Lois is not the obvious choice. She's difficult, she's sophisticated, she's from the city, she's all the things that he's not. They make a really interesting couple, but a complicated couple," Deborah explained. Deborah also stated that although Superman saves Lois physically, she saves him emotionally.

Amy Adams saw a lot to like about Lois' straightforward approachability, a quality that would appeal to a Kansas farm boy. "I think there was a great juxtaposition between this sort of Man of Steel and woman of Earth," Adams said. Henry Cavill says it is essential for Lois to know Clark's secret and that she saves him just as much as he saves her. "I think the interaction between Lois and Superman is that she is obviously Superwoman, in a societal sense. And then she's finally found this one guy who can literally sweep her off her feet," Cavill said. Cavill also noted: "What is between Clark and Lois is a very personal thing. He opens her eyes to a world she didn't know existed and she opens his eyes to the idea of what he sees as a more normal existence."

In the film, Lois first meets Clark Kent in the Arctic, while writing a story about a scientific discovery of an unidentified object found in the Arctic ice. There, Lois follows Clark to the buried Kryptonian scout ship and became aware of his abilities, when Clark saved and heals her after she was attacked by a Kryptonian drone. Over the next several weeks Lois begins to search for Clark's identity, by tracking down his activities in the past few years. Lois eventually arrives in his hometown Smallville and speaks with his mother Martha Kent. Clark and Lois meet again in the Smallville cemetery. And after revealing to Lois about his father's death, Lois decides to keep Clark's identity a secret.

When General Zod arrives on Earth and demands the humans to surrender Kal-El (Clark), Lois is arrested by the FBI, on the belief, she knows the identity of Kal-El. Clark agrees to hand himself into the government in exchange for Lois' freedom. Later both Clark and Lois are taken to General Zod's ship and are interrogated by Zod's forces. Clark manages to defeat Zod's forces with the help of both Lois and Jor-El. At the battle of Metropolis Clark kissed Lois before Zod arrives and attacked him. Clark ultimately ended the fight by killing Zod, when Lois arrived she consoles him. Some time afterward, Clark decides to join the Daily Planet and is introduced to Lois as a new stringer, and Lois plays along with his new secret identity.

Batman v Superman: Dawn of Justice
Amy Adams and Henry Cavill reprise their roles in Batman v Superman: Dawn of Justice (2016). Clark and Lois are now dating and living together. Lois' connection to Superman has prompted some to use her against the Kryptonian hero, with Lex Luthor initiating his plan against Superman by arranging for Lois to be abducted by insurgents and threatened so that Superman's intervention would create a potential international incident. However, Clark's love for her also prompts him to regain faith in himself after failing to stop a bomb plot by Luthor, and ultimately convinces him to sacrifice himself to kill Doomsday and likely save the world, as his last words are "you are my world". At the end of the film, after Superman's death, Martha gives Lois an engagement ring which Clark originally planned to give her.

Justice League
Henry Cavill and Amy Adams reprise their roles in Justice League (2017). On what role does Lois Lane fulfill for Superman, Cavill stated that: "I think Lois was, and is, a true anchor for Superman, and she always has been."

Lois is still grieving over Clark's death and is writing fluff pieces for the Daily Planet. Batman and his allies decide to use the Mother Box to resurrect Superman to help them fight off Steppenwolf and his Parademon army (but also to restore hope to mankind). Superman is successfully resurrected, however, his memories have not returned and attacks the league. Lois becomes Batman's secret contingency plan and helps calm Superman down. Clark leaves with Lois to his family home in Smallville where he tries to recover his memories. Clark and Lois reaffirm their love for each other before Superman join the battle against Steppenwolf.

In Zack Snyder's 2021 director's cut of Justice League, Lois has stopped coming into her job at the Daily Planet due to her grief and visits Superman's monument in Heroes Park regularly until convinced by Martian Manhunter (posing as Martha Kent) to go back to work. After visiting the monument one last time, she witnesses Clark's revival and runs to him as he battles the other heroes. Lois is revealed to be pregnant with Clark's child, and Superman sensing her pregnancy helped calm him during the fight with the other heroes. The "Snyder Cut" and Batman v Superman both allude to a dark future timeline in which Darkseid takes over the world and enslaves Superman with the Anti-Life Equation after killing Lois.

Television series

Adventures of Superman

Adventures of Superman is an American television series in the 1950s. The show is the first live-action television series to feature the comic book character Superman and began filming in 1951. Sponsored by the cereal company Kellogg's, the series ran from September 1952 to April 1958 and starring George Reeves as Clark Kent/Superman and Phyllis Coates as Lois Lane in the first season. Noel Neill played Lois from seasons two to season six opposite Reeves.

The series follows Superman as he battles crooks, gangsters, and other villains in the city of Metropolis while masquerading as the Daily Planet reporter Clark Kent. Lois Lane and Jimmy Olsen, Clark's colleagues at the office, often find themselves in dangerous situations which can only be resolved with Superman's timely intervention.

Lois & Clark: The New Adventures of Superman

Lois & Clark: The New Adventures of Superman is a live-action television series in the 1990s, based on the comic book character Superman. The series takes us from the moment Clark Kent/Superman arrives in Metropolis and applies for a job at the Daily Planet, to his first meeting with Lois Lane, through to their romantic relationship and eventual marriage.

The series ran from 1993 to 1997 and stars Dean Cain as Superman/Clark Kent and Teri Hatcher as Lois Lane. The show loosely followed John Byrne's six-issue comic book series, The Man of Steel, which significantly rewrote Superman's origin, with Clark Kent as the true personality and Superman a disguise. The main characteristic of this series is that it gave special focus on the relationship between Clark and Lois.

In the series, Jonathan and Martha Kent witness the crash-landing of a small spaceship in Shuster's Field near Smallville, Kansas in 1966. When they investigate the craft, they discover the baby Kal-El and decide to raise him as their own, naming him Clark Jerome Kent. 27 years later, Clark moves to Metropolis and gets a job at the Daily Planet. There, he is partnered with Lois Lane, who at first considers him little more than a pest. Eventually, the two fall in love and marry, after a turbulent courtship: including Lois being kidnapped by Lex Luthor and replaced with a frog eating clone, Lois suffering from amnesia, and Clark being called away to serve as a leader on New Krypton. Clark and Lois finally get married in the episode "Swear to God, This Time We're Not Kidding." Their marriage on the television series was timed to coincide with the release of the comic book special Superman: The Wedding Album, which depicts the couple's wedding in DC Comics.

Smallville

The television series Smallville aired from 2001 to 2011. The series began with a teenage Clark Kent (Tom Welling) learning to balance the demands of his powers with his desire to lead a normal life. It shows Clark's reluctance to accept his Kryptonian heritage, his responsibility for his abilities, his longing desire to be normal and his constant fear of people discovering his secret. In the series, Clark's affection began with Lana Lang, his childhood crush in the comics. Lois Lane (Erica Durance) was introduced in the fourth season as Chloe Sullivan's cousin. Clark and Lois first developed a friendship and in later seasons a romantic interaction; with Clark gradually starts to fall in love with Lois and realize that she is the one for him, and eventually revealing his alien origin to her. Clark and Lois' relationship in Smallville was on TV Guide's "Best TV Couples of All Time".

The writers of the show were constrained to limit the usage of Clark and Lois' romantically relationship, and in the Lois Lane character in general. At Wizard World Philadelphia Erica Durance revealed that; "DC Comics has really clamped down on Lois. You can't do a dream sequence (with her and Clark) or any of that sneaky stuff". Starting from season 6 (after the release of Superman Returns) the restrictions on Lois and Clark's romance were less restricted. Throughout the series, the show foreshadowed Clark and Lois' future romances, which was woven throughout their interactions from the moment Lois was introduced to the series. Including Lois revealing that a fortune teller once told her that she was destined to fall for a guy who flies a lot and likes to wear tights, or saying she prefers geeks in glasses. And numerous other hints and comments made by Clark or Lois, and other characters on the show.

In season 4, at the end of the episode "Lucy", after Clark and Lois admit for the first time that they have become friends, two stars collide, referring to Clark and Lois as coming together.

In season 5, series producer Darren Swimmer describes the relationship between Clark and Lois in the fifth season as "a bit of a melting of the ice". The two characters continue to "butt heads", but the audience can see where there is a growing attraction and that either would be there for the other in a time of need. Erica Durance feels that in season five it is not yet clear if either character realizes the attraction, but the joking between the two characters represents a foreshadowing of a greater relationship. Durance sees season five as being too soon for the characters to be "in-love" because they are still getting to know each other.

In season 6, the relationship between Clark and Lois is still undefined for the audience. Erica Durance described the relationship between Clark and Lois in season six as something neither character wanted to put an official label on. The pair has learned to deal with each other's "quirks", but there are still moments that both feel uncomfortable with. Durance believes that Clark and Lois are satisfied with identifying with a "brother-sister friendship" label, rather than trying to discover how they both truly feel about each other. Writer Brian Peterson describes Lois' relationship with Oliver Queen in season six as a precursor to her future relationship with Clark. Peterson sees the dynamic between Lois and Oliver—with Lois willingness to accept Oliver's secret identity as Green Arrow—mirroring the relationship Lois will have with Clark. In the episode "Hydro", Clark and Lois share their first kiss. However, Lois was unaware that she was kissing Clark, as he was disguising himself as Green Arrow (Oliver, Lois' boyfriend at the time). In the episode "Crimson", Clark is infected by Red Kryptonite (which in the series removes his inhibitions) Clark's action, behavior and his conversation with his mother, shows that he was attracted to Lois at some level.

In season 7, Clark and Lois made a huge progression in their relationship. In the episode "Siren", Lois (after breaking up with Oliver Queen) in a very emotionally vulnerable state told Clark that she knows what it's like to love someone who has a destiny greater than her own. In the episode "Apocalypse" (which heavily underlines the Superman mythos) Jor-El sent Clark to an alternate reality where Clark never came to Earth, and Lois meeting Clark Kent for the first time at the Daily Planet and the two character have an instant attraction to each other. And Clark exposing his powers to save Lois' life and working with her to stop president Lex Luthor's plans for world domination.

In season 8, Clark and Lois took another crucial step towards their relationship, with Clark start to work at the Daily Planet working alongside Lois. The writers for the series stated that in season eight, Lois finds out about her true feelings towards Clark. Erica Durance describes season eight as a lesson in duality, with Clark realizing that he has to be two different people if he wants to have a life and save the day. Durance believes that the same applies to Lois. Durance explains, "[Lois has] got her confidence as a journalist and on the inside, she's going oh my god I'm truly in love with [Clark], more in love than I've ever been with anyone." In the episode "Instinct", Maxima, an alien princess who came to Earth to seek a suitable mate, chose Clark. When Lois broke Maxima's spell over Clark, Maxima confronts Lois; saying that Clark's attraction to Lois and the bond between them was the only way that Clark was able to resist her spell. In the episode "Committed", Lois was put under a lie detector test by a serial killer and admitted that she was in love with Clark. In the episode "Bride", the two shared many moments of attraction towards each other and almost sharing a kiss, but was interrupted by the return of Lana. At the end of the season, Lois was sent to the future. Clark believing Lois was killed in Doomsday's attack on the city (this and the death of Jimmy Olsen) leads him to leave behind his human identity and fully embrace only his Kryptonian side.

In season 9, Lois returns to the present in the episode "Savior" but has lost her memory of when and where she has been. Lois' reappearance breaks Clark's self-imposed exile, prompting him to return to the Daily Planet. Soon, the two were seen flirting much more. In the first nine episodes, Lois is seen having dreams and visions of the future, which includes her and Clark making love. In the episode "Crossfire", Clark finally shows his true feeling for Lois and kissed her, which Lois reciprocated in the episode "Idol". In the episode "Pandora", the truth of what Lois saw in her visions is revealed. At the end of the episode, Clark and Lois decide to become an official couple. Throughout the rest of season nine, the two took slow steps in their relationship because both want this relationship to be the one they "got right". In the season finale episode "Salvation", as the Blur, Clark kissed Lois and she discovers his secret as the superhero vigilante, the Blur. It is made clear in the season ten premiere episode "Lazarus" Clark doesn't realize that Lois knows his secret.

In season 10, several new milestones occurred in their relationship; from "I love you" exchanged, Clark revealing his secret as the Blur to Lois, to them consummating their love. In the episode "Ambush", it is implied that Clark asked Sam Lane (Lois' father) for her hand in marriage. Clark reveals the engagement ring in the episode "Abandoned" and proposed to Lois in the episode "Icarus", which Lois happily accepts. Over the course of the season, the two grow closer than ever, learning to rely on each other and help each other through challenges both normal and super. Their wedding ceremony occurred in the series finale, only to be interrupted by the coming of Darkseid and his planet Apokolips. Clark defeated the evil entity and saved the world, and finally becomes Superman. A flash forward to the future depicts Clark and Lois working as reporters seven years later at the Daily Planet and still trying to find the right time to get married.

In 2019, Durance and Welling reprised their roles as Lois and Clark in the Arrowverse crossover event "Crisis on Infinite Earths". Set ten years after the Smallville series, Lois and Clark are now married with young daughters, and Clark gave up his superpowers to be with his family.

Arrowverse
Tyler Hoechlin portrayed Superman/Clark Kent with Elizabeth Tulloch as Lois Lane in The CW Arrowverse television series. Superman was introduced in the second season of Supergirl. Lois first appeared in the 2018 crossover event "Elseworlds" in the series The Flash and Supergirl.

The executive producers stated that Clark and Lois have a strong partnership. Tyler Hoechlin says Clark and Lois "obviously have a very strong relationship that's been going like that for a while. It's deeper into the relationship, so there's that comfortability factor and they know each other so well. They really kind of have a life together."

When Superman arrives in National City in the episode "The Adventures of Supergirl", Clark and Lois were first mentioned as being a couple. In the episode "Nevertheless, She Persisted", Clark reveals to Kara that his love for Lois motivates him in every fight. Whenever he fights, no matter who it's against or where it is, his always fighting for Lois. He fights with Lois in his heart. The people we love is another secret to the superpower.

In The Flash episode "Elseworlds" part 1, Kara Danvers/Supergirl is visiting her cousin on the Kent farm in Smallville to seek advice and spend time with Clark and Lois, who recently visited Argo City to learn more about the Kryptonian culture, with Lois intent to write an article detailing their visit, despite Clark's objections. When Oliver Queen and Barry Allen with swapped abilities arrives at the Kent farm on Earth-38 to get help from Kara, she introduces them to Clark and Lois. When Cisco Ramon arrives to inform them about the Amazo rampage in Central City, Clark leaves with them to join the fight.

In the Supergirl episode "Elseworlds" part 3, Lois, wielding a lightning hammer and Superman go to Earth-1 to assists Supergirl, Green Arrow, Brainiac 5, J'onn J'onzz, and the Flash in fighting John Deegan in the form of a black suit-wearing Superman. After defeating John Deegan and returning to Earth-38, Clark and Lois reveal to Kara that Lois is pregnant and they will be returning to Argo City for an extended period, leaving Kara to defend the Earth. Later, at the Fortress of Solitude, Clark proposes to Lois with a diamond ring made from coal. She happily accepts and kisses him.

In the 2019 crossover "Crisis on Infinite Earths", Lois and Clark are married and is living on Argo City with their infant son Jonathan. The couple and their son evacuated to Earth and  helped the earth's heroes defeated the Anti-Monitor. Following the crisis, the multiverse is restored but changed, with Lois and Clark now have two sons.

Superman & Lois

In 2021, Tyler Hoechlin and Elizabeth Tulloch reprise their roles as Superman/Clark Kent and Lois Lane in the television series Superman & Lois. Jordan Elsass and Alexander Garfin play Lois and Clark's teenage sons Jonathan Kent and Jordan Kent. The series follows the life and adventures of Clark and Lois as they deal with all the stress, pressures and complexities that come with being working parents in today's society.

Animations

Fleischer Superman cartoons
The first animated appearance of Superman, released in Technicolor by Paramount Pictures in a series of animated short films. They are collectively known as "The Fleischer Superman cartoons". A total of seventeen films were produced from 1941 to 1943. Fleischer Studios made the first nine animated short and Famous Studios produced the final eight. Superman, the first animated short was nominated for an Academy Award in 1942 and was voted #33 of the 50 Greatest Cartoons of all time. Bud Collyer voiced Superman/Clark Kent and Joan Alexander voiced Lois Lane.

Superman: The Animated Series

Superman: The Animated Series aired on Kids' WB from September 1996 to February 2000. Tim Daly voiced Superman/Clark Kent and Dana Delany as Lois Lane.

When developing the series, the producers made the decision to establish Lois as a character much more grounded in her Golden Age roots, that of a sharp, aggressive, and career-minded reporter who wasn't afraid to dig deep into the Metropolis dirt to gain a story, with Clark Kent as the voice of caution and reason in his alter-ego, and as the well-meaning, boy scout in his role as Superman.

In the series, already accustomed to a world filled with madmen, Superman's heroics in Metropolis do not impress Lois initially, and her professional rivalry with his alter-ego Clark Kent isn't any better. Lois is severely territorial over her stories and constantly teases Clark by calling him "Smallville" (a line adapted in the comics and the Smallville television series.)

Following a trip to an alternate universe in "Brave New Metropolis," Lois is surprised and dismayed to find Superman has sold out to Lex Luthor after her alternate self-was killed, finally beginning to realize she meant much more to Superman. After this version of Superman saved the world from Lex Luthor's dominion, Lois kissed him before returning to her own reality, becoming much closer to Superman afterward, aware of how delicate his feelings are. Lois also became more affectionate to Clark as the series progressed, confiding in him as a friend, though their rivalry at times became more heated on a personal basis because of this. In the three-part story "World's Finest," Bruce Wayne CEO of Wayne Enterprises arrived in Metropolis and starts a relationship with Lois. Lois actually considers moving to Gotham City, much to Clark's dismay. But Lois eventually learned that Bruce Wayne was the Gotham City vigilante Batman, and ended the relationship.

In "The Late Mr. Kent," Clark is forced to fake his death in order to sniff out an assassin who has targeted his alter-ego. Unaware of his survival, Lois takes the loss of her partner hard and becomes consumed with uncovering the truth behind his murder, enlisting Superman's help. Whilst investigating Clark's apartment, Lois breaks down, admitting to Superman that she respected and really liked Clark, but never told him. Lois and Superman continued to have a friendly, yet distanced relationship, neither really taking the first step until the events of the series finale "Legacy", where Superman is briefly turned against the world by Darkseid. After overcoming the threat of Apokolips yet again, Superman admits to Lois that it will take him a long time to restore humanity's faith in him; but Lois assures him he's already got one less human to worry about and kisses him. In the animated series Justice League Unlimited (where Superman was voiced by George Newbern), the two continue to date while Lois maintains a more amiable relationship with Clark.

My Adventures With Superman
Jack Quaid and Alice Lee will voice Superman/Clark Kent and Lois Lane in the upcoming HBO Max and Cartoon Network animated series My Adventures With Superman. The series follows the adventures of Clark, Lois and Jimmy Olsen as an investigative reporting team at the Daily Planet. It features a young Clark Kent, new to his powers, as he builds his secret Superman identity and embraces his role as the hero of Metropolis and the world, and Lois as a star investigative journalist. Sharing adventures, taking down bad guys, all the while falling in love with each other.

In popular culture
In the movie Mermaids (1990) Kate Flax asked her sister Charlotte if her boyfriend ever kissed her like Superman kisses Lois Lane.
"Deeply Dippy" by the English band Right Said Fred featured on the album Up includes a line "I'm your Superman, I'll explain you're my Lois Lane."
In the Seinfeld episode "The Race," Jerry dates a woman named Lois and enjoys frequently using her first name and slyly making Superman-related references in her presence.
In the Seinfeld episode "The Face Painter," George discovers that a woman he is dating is deaf in one ear and therefore might not have heard him tell her he loves her. "Don't you see what this means?" he says. "It's like the whole thing never happened. It's like when Superman reversed the rotation of the Earth to save Lois Lane!"
In Sabrina, the Teenage Witch episode "Super Hero," Sabrina's boyfriend Harvey became the superhero "Mighty Teen." After rescuing Sabrina, Harvey tells Sabrina "you're my world." Sabrina replies "now I know why Superman ruined Lois for other men."
"Lois Lane" by British indie rock band Farrah from the album Moustache includes the line "If you'll be my Lois Lane, I'll be your Superman, if you'd only call my name, I'd be your Superman."
The song "Invincible" by Emma Bunton from the single, Take My Breath Away, includes the line "Like Superman and Lois Lane, we are just as strong, we are just the same."
"100 Ways" by former 'N Sync member JC Chasez featured on the album Schizophrenic in a line referencing sexual roleplay "I'll be your Superman, and you play Lois Lane."
"Superman" a song by the band Stereophonics on their album Language. Sex. Violence. Other? has the line "Superman on an airplane, sitting next to Lois Lane."
"Love Fight" a song by Dannii Minogue featured on the album The Hits & Beyond has the line "Heavy breathing always makes me feel like I'm Lois with the Man of Steel."
"Superman" by Robin Thicke from his album The Evolution of Robin Thicke has the line "I'm a Superman thanks to Lois Lane."
"Love the Way You Lie" by Eminem and Rihanna featured on his album Recovery includes the line "Cuz when it's going good, it's going great, I'm Superman with the wind in his back, she's Lois Lane."
The poem "I'm a Superman, thanks to Lois Lane" by Rudy Francisco (featured in Keone Madrid's dance video Lois Lane) includes the line "Superman... The Man of steel, Big Blue, the last son of Krypton, he is faster than a speeding bullet, stronger than a locomotive, he has Lasers for eyes, X-ray vision and can fly without even flapping his arms, but his most notable power... was Lois Lane, the love of an amazing woman is a phone booth, that can turn a man from a spineless news reporter into a symbol of justice, into the reason why it's safe to walk outside while the sun is sleeping."
The song "Superhero" by 5 Seconds of Summer includes the line "She met him on the staircase, like Kent and Lois Lane."
"Lois Lane" a song by pop artist Noelle Bean includes the line "I'm so happy, and now we're flying, like Superman and Lois Lane".
The poem "To Lois" by Shane Koyczan is a love letter from Superman to Lois Lane, written from Clark's perspective as he expresses his love, fear, and hope.

References

External links
Clark and Lois at Smallville Wiki
Redboots History of Lois and Clark 

1938 comics debuts
Superman
Love stories
Fictional married couples
Superman characters
Lois Lane